The Accra–Winneba Highway is a major highway in Ghana. The highway links Accra, the capital of Ghana to Winneba the capital of the Effutu Municipal District of the Central region.  The highway also connects the country's capital with other major highways that link Cape Coast and Takoradi in the Western Region.

References

Roads in Ghana